Miss Call is a 2021 Indian Bengali movie which was directed by Ravi Kinagi and produced by Nispal Singh under the banner of Surinder Films. This film is a remake of 2015 Kannada film Krishna Leela. This film starred Soham Chakraborty, Rittika Sen and Supriyo Dutta. The film was released in theaters on 26 February 2021.

Cast
 Soham Chakraborty
 Rittika Sen
 Supriyo Dutta
 Reshmi Sen
 Buddhadeb Bhattacharya
 Shantilal Mukherjee

Soundtrack

References

External links
 

Bengali-language Indian films
Films directed by Rabi Kinagi
Bengali remakes of Kannada films
2020s Bengali-language films